Paolaura is a genus of very small sea snails, marine gastropod mollusks or micromollusks in the family Granulinidae.

Species
Species within the genus Paolaura include:
Paolaura cancellata Boyer, 2018
Paolaura kenyaensis Smriglio & Mariottini, 2001
Paolaura kloosi Bozzetti, 2009
Paolaura maldivensis Smriglio & Mariottini, 2001
Paolaura semistriata Smiriglio & Mariottini, 2001

References

Granulinidae